Arbeit Plus is a German workplace certification created in 1999. It is an award for socially sustainable corporate policies and innovative employment policies. Bearer of the initiative is the Evangelical Church in Germany. The chair of the award committee is the chairman of the Council of the Evangelical Church in Germany.

Responsible for the verification procedure is the Institute for Economic and Social Ethics (IWS) at the University of Marburg.

Indicators

Opportunities in life: Creating jobs 

 Employment trends by cross-sectoral comparison
 Attitude and acceptance of trainees
 Hiring older workers
 Hiring of long-term unemployed
 Employment of disabled

Participation opportunities: Securing employment 

 Dealing with employment risks
 Integration with social security payments
 Education and training
 Health management
 Quality assurance systems

Development opportunities: Shaping employment 

 Family support
 Age management - shaping demographic change
 Gender and career
 Flexible working time models
 Part-time employment and the promotion of "part-time culture"

Social culture: Developing the work-oriented society 

 Corporate citizenship
 Mission statement
 Codetermination
 Leadership and conflict culture
 Employee share ownership

References 

 https://web.archive.org/web/20130325024850/http://www.arbeit-plus.de/
 List of indicators for the "Arbeit Plus" certification

Certification marks